The Town of Apple River is located in Polk County, Wisconsin, United States. The population was 1,067 at the 2000 census. The unincorporated community of Range is located partially in the town.

Geography

Demographics
As of the census of 2000, there were 1,067 people, 418 households, and 310 families residing in the town. The racial makeup of the town was 97.84% White, 0.28% African American, 1.31% Native American, and 0.56% from two or more races. Hispanic or Latino of any race were 1.31% of the population.

There were 418 households, out of which 33.0% had children under the age of 18 living with them, 62.4% were married couples living together, 6.9% had a female householder with no husband present, and 25.8% were non-families. 19.6% of all households were made up of individuals, and 5.0% had someone living alone who was 65 years of age or older. The average household size was 2.55 and the average family size was 2.93.

In the town, the population was spread out, with 26.1% under the age of 18, 5.3% from 18 to 24, 28.6% from 25 to 44, 28.2% from 45 to 64, and 11.7% who were 65 years of age or older. The median age was 39 years. For every 100 females, there were 108.0 males. For every 100 females age 18 and over, there were 105.2 males.

The median income for a household in the town was $43,500, and the median income for a family was $45,781. Males had a median income of $37,596 versus $21,875 for females. The per capita income for the town was $19,331. About 5.6% of families and 7.4% of the population were below the poverty line, including 10.4% of those under age 18 and 3.1% of those age 65 or over.

Education
Unity School District
Amery School District

References

External links
 Town of Apple River Web Site

Towns in Polk County, Wisconsin
Towns in Wisconsin